Charles Barthold is a news photographer for WHO-TV of Des Moines, Iowa, who won the 1976 Peabody Award for his film and photography of the Jordan Tornado in Jordan, Iowa. The film and video he shot allowed famed University of Chicago meteorologist Ted Fujita to clearly see that one of the tornadoes was an anticyclonic tornado. The Barthold film was the first time that such a tornado had been captured on film and opened up a branch of tornado study to determine how the anticyclonic vortex formed.

He was Staff Editor and Editor-in-Chief of Yachting Magazine from 1987 to 1999, as well as contributing editorial copy and photographs.

External links
 Peabody Winners Book
 Partial clip of the Jordan, IA tornado special

References

American photojournalists
Peabody Award winners
Living people
Year of birth missing (living people)